Schweinitzer Fließ is a river in Brandenburg and Saxony-Anhalt, Germany. It flows into the Schwarze Elster near Jessen (Elster).

See also
List of rivers of Brandenburg
List of rivers of Saxony-Anhalt

Rivers of Brandenburg
Rivers of Saxony-Anhalt
Rivers of Germany